Daviesia acicularis, commonly known as sharp bitter-pea, is a species of flowering plant in the family Fabaceae and is endemic to eastern Australia. It is a small, wiry shrub with tapering, linear phyllodes, and single yellow to orange and dark red flowers.

Description

Taxonomy and naming
Daviesia acicularis was first formally described in 1805 by James Edward Smith in his book Annals of Botany from specimens collected at Port Jackson.

Distribution
This species of pea grows in forest and grassland from Tambo and Charleville in central Queensland to Eden and inland as far as Cowra, West Wyalong and Enngonia in New South Wales.

References

acicularis
Flora of New South Wales
Flora of the Australian Capital Territory
Flora of Queensland
Plants described in 1805
Taxa named by James Edward Smith